Yves Lampaert (born 10 April 1991) is a Belgian road racing cyclist, who rides for UCI WorldTeam .

Career

Lampaert practiced judo from the age of six, earned a black belt, but at the age of 17 started training in cycling.

He rode at the 2014 and 2015 UCI Road World Championships. He was named in the startlist for the 2016 Vuelta a España.

Lampaert won the 2017 Dwars door Vlaanderen, a local race for him, after he soloed away to the victory after making the race-defining split along with teammate Philippe Gilbert, Alexey Lutsenko from the  team, and 's Luke Durbridge. Lampaert attacked with  remaining and ultimately won the race by 39 seconds ahead of Gilbert.

Lampaert won Stage 2 of the 2017 Vuelta a España after he broke clear of the peloton in strong winds with three kilometres to go with three Quick Step teammates, Niki Terpstra, Julian Alaphilippe and Matteo Trentin. Lampaert than attacked to take a solo victory and by doing so he gained the race leader's red jersey. 

In 2018, Lampaert won Dwars door Vlaanderen for the second year in a row, becoming the first rider to win the race in consecutive years. In July 2018, he was named in the start list for the 2018 Tour de France.

Lampaert won the first stage of the 2022 Tour de France, ahead of Wout van Aert and Tadej Pogačar.

Personal life
Lampaert is the son of a farmer, with his family owning a  property in Ingelmunster.

Major results
Source: 

2012
 1st  Time trial, National Under-23 Road Championships
 2nd Paris–Roubaix Espoirs
 7th Paris–Tours Espoirs
2013
 1st Grote Prijs Stad Geel
 5th Time trial, National Road Championships
 5th Châteauroux Classic
 9th Druivenkoers Overijse
 10th Overall Tour des Fjords
2014
 1st Arnhem–Veenendaal Classic
 4th Kuurne–Brussels–Kuurne
 5th Road race, National Road Championships
 5th Ronde van Drenthe
 6th Ronde van Zeeland Seaports
 9th Halle–Ingooigem
2015
 1st  Overall Driedaagse van West-Vlaanderen
1st  Points classification
1st  Young rider classification
1st  West Flanders classification
1st Stage 1
 2nd  Team time trial, UCI Road World Championships
 2nd Time trial, National Road Championships
 2nd Overall Ster ZLM Toer
 4th Ronde van Zeeland Seaports
 5th Le Samyn
 6th Paris–Tours
 7th Paris–Roubaix
 9th Overall Three Days of De Panne
 9th Rund um Köln
 10th RideLondon–Surrey Classic
2016
 UCI Road World Championships
1st  Team time trial
7th Time trial
 2nd Time trial, National Road Championships
 5th Eschborn–Frankfurt – Rund um den Finanzplatz
 6th Time trial, UEC European Road Championships
 9th Overall Tour of Belgium
2017
 1st  Time trial, National Road Championships
 1st Dwars door Vlaanderen
 1st Gullegem Koerse
 Vuelta a España
1st Stage 2
Held  after Stage 2
Held  after Stage 2
 7th Paris–Tours
2018
 1st  Team time trial, UCI Road World Championships
 National Road Championships
1st  Road race
3rd Time trial
 1st Dwars door Vlaanderen
 2nd Binche–Chimay–Binche
 4th Time trial, UEC European Road Championships
 5th Great War Remembrance Race
2019
 1st  Overall Okolo Slovenska
 1st Gullegem Koerse
 1st Stage 8 (ITT) Tour de Suisse
 UEC European Road Championships
2nd  Road race
7th Time trial
 2nd Time trial, National Road Championships
 3rd Overall Deutschland Tour
 3rd Paris–Roubaix
 5th Kuurne–Brussels–Kuurne
 7th Omloop Het Nieuwsblad
 8th Dwars door Vlaanderen
2020
 1st Three Days of Bruges–De Panne
 2nd Omloop Het Nieuwsblad
 4th Overall BinckBank Tour
 5th Tour of Flanders
 7th Gent–Wevelgem
 8th Overall Okolo Slovenska
2021
 1st  Time trial, National Road Championships
 1st Stage 7 Tour of Britain
 2nd Overall Tour of Belgium
 2nd Heistse Pijl
 3rd Dwars door het Hageland
 4th Dwars door Vlaanderen
 5th Paris–Roubaix
 6th Primus Classic
2022
 Tour de France
1st Stage 1 (ITT)
Held  &  after Stage 1
 1st Stage 3 (ITT) Tour of Belgium
 2nd Time trial, National Road Championships
 6th Grand Prix de Fourmies
 9th Time trial, UCI Road World Championships
 10th Paris–Roubaix

Grand Tour general classification results timeline

Classics results timeline

References

External links
 

1991 births
Living people
Belgian male cyclists
People from Izegem
Cyclists from West Flanders
Belgian Tour de France stage winners
Belgian Vuelta a España stage winners
Tour de Suisse stage winners
Belgian male judoka